Trilocha annae is a moth in the family Bombycidae. It was described by Paul Thiaucourt in 1997. It is found in Napo Province, Ecuador.

References

Bombycidae
Moths described in 1997